Lightbody on Liberty is a 1936 comedy novel by the British writer Nigel Balchin. A small-time shopkeeper is arrested by the police despite being intensely law-abiding. Defended by a political business tycoon, his case becomes the basis for an entire social movement.

References

Bibliography
 Clive James. At the Pillars of Hercules. Pan Macmillan, 2013.

1936 British novels
Novels by Nigel Balchin
British comedy novels
William Collins, Sons books